This page lists the winners and nominees for the Soul Train Music Award for Best Gospel Album. The award was first given during the 1989 ceremony, after the categories honoring solo albums and group albums were combined. The category was retired after the 2007 ceremony.

Winners and nominees
Winners are listed first and highlighted in bold.

1980s

1990s

2000s

See also
 Soul Train Music Award for Best Gospel Album – Group or Band
 Soul Train Music Award for Best Gospel Album – Solo

References

Soul Train Music Awards
Awards established in 1989
Awards disestablished in 2007
Album awards